BabyTV (stylised as Babytv) is a multilingual, international television channel for babies, toddlers and preschoolers aged 3 or lower, owned by Fox Networks Group, a subsidiary of the Disney International Content and Operations division of The Walt Disney Company. It is headquartered in London and was first launched in 2003 in Israel and 2005 in the United Kingdom. BabyTV is distributed in over 100 countries, broadcasting in 18 languages (as of 2013). The channel broadcasts shows without television commercial interruptions. In the United States, the channel is distributed by Walt Disney Television.

History
BabyTV was first developed in December 2003 as an educational block in Israel by Ron Isaak, Maya and Liran Talit and members of their families. They decided to create an educational television channel for babies and toddlers. It was first launched as a channel in July 2005, and in October 2007, News Corp's Fox International Channels acquired a major stake in BabyTV, placing it alongside its international offerings of Fox Crime, Fox, National Geographic and others. The first six programmes to air on BabyTV were Hands Up, Tulli, Bouncy Balls, Jammers, Little Chick and 1, 2, 3, Tell A Story.

In 2006, Indovision with Dori Media Distribution started operating them in Indonesia. Rebranded as Vision 3 Baby, this channel is dubbed in Indonesian and has the same program content and schedules which BabyTV Asia beams; however, advertising is different on both beams. Vision 3 Baby has since been replaced by the international version of BabyTV. BabyTV was also launched on Sky Digital in the UK on 5 February 2007.

In 2008, French authorities banned the broadcasting of programs aimed at children under the age of 3, and ordered warnings to be included on foreign channels available in France such as BabyTV and its competitor BabyFirst.

The channel, along with Fox Crime and Fox, was launched in India on 25 March 2009.

In January 2011, BabyTV was added to the programming package of Dish Network on channel 126, and then changed to channel 824. On 9 May 2011, BabyTV was launched via Astro channel 614 and then changed to channel 618. On 1 December 2011, BabyTV was launched via SkyCable channel 140 and is only available through its digital platform. On 1 October 2012, BabyTV was launched via mio TV(now known as Singtel TV) channel 244 and it was the first to launch the channel in HDTV 16:9 Format. In Hong Kong, Taiwan and Macau, it is available on Now TV Channel 448, Macau Cable TV Channel 61 (SD) and 861 (HD)  and Taiwan CATV Channel 311 (HD) and CHT MOD Channel 17.  A Spanish version is available in the United States on cable and satellite providers (typically Dish Network) in some states. It is also available on Orbit Network, OSN Network, beIN Network and My-HD with Arabic language. On 20 March 2019, the channel became a part of Walt Disney Direct-to-Consumer & International as the result of acquisition of 21st Century Fox by The Walt Disney Company.

On 1 September 2021, BabyTV ceased broadcasting on Now TV.

On 1 October 2021, BabyTV is going to be available, but, along with numerous sister TV channels run by Disney (except National Geographic Channel, Nat Geo Wild, Star Chinese Channel & Star Chinese Movies, Utsav Gold (Star Gold), Utsav Plus (Star Plus), Utsav Bharat (Star Bharat) and Vijay TV (Star Vijay) International are available on selected Pay TV providers) will end transmissions in Southeast Asia. On 18 October 2021, Disney announced that it would close down BabyTV in India alongside Star World and Star World Premiere HD on 15 March 2023, following similar decisions taken worldwide to close down English general entertainment channels.

On 9 January 2022, Astro was informed its customers that BabyTV HD (Ch 618) would close its operations to Disney+ on 1 February 2022, and be replaced by Moonbug Kids (as a preview channel seen on Channel 620 on 18 January 2022 before the channel was added on their Kids Pack).

On 9 June 2022, BabyTV ceased broadcasting in Latvia, because the TV license was from Russia.

On 1 October 2022, BabyTV was closed in Italy and Russia, alongside the Italian and Russian versions of National Geographic and National Geographic Wild, discontinuing in the process any active linear TV services in Italy and Russia apart from Disney Channel in Russia under the control of The Walt Disney Company.

Topics
BabyTV's original programming library, which is developed in-house in co-operation with childhood development experts and content experts is built around nine developmental topics, which cover all early learning skills and developmental milestones for babies and toddlers.

Stick With Mick Is a Tv Show That Aired On Babytv in July 9, 2010.

The nine categories, include the following. They are:
 First Concepts
 Nature & Animals
 Music & Art
 Imagination & Creativity
 Building Friendships
 Songs & Rhymes
 Guessing Games
 Activities
 Bedtime

On demand
BabyTV's video on demand service features edited segments of BabyTV programming, categorized into their nine developmental themes, in hundreds of half hour segments and is available in languages including English, French, Spanish, Portuguese, Mandarin and Turkish. The on-demand channel is available on Singtel TV. It will be launched to StarHub TV in Singapore and other pay TV providers in Asia in the future.

Home video
BabyTV has introduced a DVD offering. "My First Years Library" is a library that covers early learning skills and developmental milestones that children encounter in their first years. BabyTV's DVD collection features segments of BabyTV content and includes some of the channel's leading characters, such as Pitch & Potch, & Kenny & Goorie.

Broadcasting
RR Media provides playout and uplink services to the BabyTV channel. Languages are encrypted and uplinked via Hotbird 6, Measat 3a and Galaxy 23.

References

External links

2003 establishments in the United Kingdom
Television channels in the United Kingdom
Television channels in the Netherlands
Preschool education television networks
Commercial-free television networks
Children's television networks in the United States
Television channels and stations established in 2005
Disney television networks
Disney television channels in the United Kingdom
Fox Networks Group